Eldric Samuel Sella Rodríguez (born 24 January 1997) is a Venezuelan boxer. He competed in the men's middleweight event at the 2020 Summer Olympics, representing the Refugee Olympic Team.

Sella competes as a refugee after fleeing Venezuela and seeking asylum in Trinidad and Tobago in 2018. Until 2014, he had competed for Venezuela with his father as his coach. Soon after being granted asylum, his family joined him. Sella has said that he hopes to inspire Venezuelan refugees around the world to know that they can succeed.

References

External links
 

1997 births
Living people
Venezuelan male boxers
Boxers at the 2020 Summer Olympics
Sportspeople from Caracas
Refugee Olympic Team at the 2020 Summer Olympics